In computer science and probability theory, a random binary tree is a binary tree selected at random from some probability distribution on binary trees. Two different distributions are commonly used: binary trees formed by inserting nodes one at a time according to a random permutation, and binary trees chosen from a uniform discrete distribution in which all distinct trees are equally likely. It is also possible to form other distributions, for instance by repeated splitting. Adding and removing nodes directly in a random binary tree will in general disrupt its random structure, but the treap and related randomized binary search tree data structures use the principle of binary trees formed from a random permutation in order to maintain a balanced binary search tree dynamically as nodes are inserted and deleted.

For random trees that are not necessarily binary, see random tree.

Binary trees from random permutations
For any set of numbers (or, more generally, values from some total order), one may form a binary search tree in which each number is inserted in sequence as a leaf of the tree, without changing the structure of the previously inserted numbers. The position into which each number should be inserted is uniquely determined by a binary search in the tree formed by the previous numbers. For instance, if the three numbers (1,3,2) are inserted into a tree in that sequence, the number 1 will sit at the root of the tree, the number 3 will be placed as its right child, and the number 2 as the left child of the number 3. There are six different permutations of the numbers (1,2,3), but only five trees may be constructed from them. That is because the permutations (2,1,3) and (2,3,1) form the same tree.

Expected depth of a node
And a value  is an ancestor of  exactly when  is the first element to be inserted from the elements in the interval . Adding these probabilities for all positions in the sorted sequence gives twice a Harmonic number, leading to the bound above. A bound of this form holds also for the expected search length of a path to a fixed value  that is not part of the given set.

To understand it by using min-max records. The number in a random permutation is the min (max) record means it is the min (max) value from the first position to its position. Consider a simple example  = (2, 4, 3, 6, 5, 1). The expected number of min (max) records is all probability of each number in a random permutation. For position , it has the probability of 1/. Therefore, the expected number of min (max) records is a Harmonic number. The searching on 's random binary tree only counts max records on (2, 1) and min records on (4, 6, 5, 1)—this is why it is twice a Harmonic number.

The longest path
Although not as easy to analyze as the average path length, there has also been much research on determining the expectation (or high probability bounds) of the length of the longest path in a binary search tree generated from a random insertion order. It is now known that this length, for a tree with  nodes, is almost surely

where  is the unique number in the range  satisfying the equation

Expected number of leaves
In the random permutation model, each of the numbers from the set of numbers used to form the tree, except for the smallest and largest of the numbers, has probability  of being a leaf in the tree, for it is a leaf when it inserted after its two neighbors, and any of the six permutations of these two neighbors and it are equally likely. By similar reasoning, the smallest and largest of the numbers have probability  of being a leaf.

Strahler Number
The Strahler number of a tree is a more sensitive measure of the distance from a leaf in which a node has Strahler number  whenever it has either a child with that number or two children with number . However, only the upper bound  has actually been proven.

Treaps and randomized binary search trees
In applications of binary search tree data structures, it is rare for the values in the tree to be inserted without deletion in a random order, limiting the direct applications of random binary trees. However, algorithm designers have devised data structures that allow insertions and deletions to be performed in a binary search tree, at each step maintaining as an invariant the property that the shape of the tree is a random variable with the same distribution as a random binary search tree.

If a given set of ordered numbers is assigned numeric priorities (distinct numbers unrelated to their values), these priorities may be used to construct a Cartesian tree for the numbers, a binary tree that has as its inorder traversal sequence the sorted sequence of the numbers and that is heap-ordered by priorities. Although more efficient construction algorithms are known, it is helpful to think of a Cartesian tree as being constructed by inserting the given numbers into a binary search tree in priority order. Such a data structure is known as a treap or a randomized binary search tree.

Uniformly random binary trees
The number of binary trees with n nodes is a Catalan number: for  these numbers of trees are
 .
Thus, if one of these trees is selected uniformly at random, its probability is the reciprocal of a Catalan number. However, the expected Strahler number of a uniformly random n-node binary tree is  lower than the expected Strahler number of random binary search trees.

Due to their large heights, this model of equiprobable random trees is not generally used for binary search trees, but it has been applied to problems of modeling the parse trees of algebraic expressions in compiler design (where the above-mentioned bound on Strahler number translates into the number of registers needed to evaluate an expression) and for modeling evolutionary trees. In some cases the analysis of random binary trees under the random permutation model can be automatically transferred to the uniform model.

Random split trees
 generate random binary trees with  nodes by generating a real-valued random variable  in the unit interval , assigning the first  nodes (rounded down to an integer number of nodes) to the left subtree, the next node to the root, and the remaining nodes to the right subtree, and continuing recursively in each subtree. If  is chosen uniformly at random in the interval, the result is the same as the random binary search tree generated by a random permutation of the nodes, as any node is equally likely to be chosen as root; however, this formulation allows other distributions to be used instead.

Notes

References
.
.
.
.
.
.
.
.
.
.
.
.
.
.
.
.

External links

Open Data Structures - Chapter 7 - Random Binary Search Trees, Pat Morin

Binary trees
Statistical randomness
Probabilistic data structures